Vishnu Tirtha (Subhaktiman) is a scholar of the Dvaita school of Vedanta philosophy and the founder of the monasteries at Sodhe and Subramanya. He left his home after his parents died to join the order of Brahma Sampradaya. He was initiated into the order by his older brother Madhvacharya (1238–1317 CE), the founder of the Dvaita school. Subhaktiman was rechristened Vishnu Tirtha after the initiation. He was succeeded by Aniruddha Tirtha at the Subramanya monastery. He also had an elder sister.

See also 

 Vadiraja swamy
 Paryaya

References 

Medieval Hindu religious leaders
Madhva religious leaders
Dvaitin philosophers
Scholars from Karnataka
Dvaita Vedanta
Tulu people
13th-century Indian scholars